Christopher Adams (10 February 1955 – 7 October 2001), best known as "Gentleman" Chris Adams, was an English professional wrestler, wrestling promoter, trainer, and judoka.

By age 21, he was a three-time British National Judo Champion in his age and weight classes. In professional wrestling, Adams gained his greatest success in World Class Championship Wrestling (WCCW), where he became the promotion's World Heavyweight Champion and one of its biggest stars. He also performed for companies such as World Championship Wrestling (WCW), and the Universal Wrestling Association (UWA), where he held the World Wrestling Federation's (WWF) Light Heavyweight Championship. All told, he held 26 titles over a 23-year career.

Adams is known for training wrestlers such as Stone Cold Steve Austin and Scott Hall (Razor Ramon), and for popularizing the superkick finishing move, which was later used by many other performers.

Early life
Adams was born in Rugby, Warwickshire, the oldest son of Cyril and Jean Adams. Beginning at the age of nine, he was involved in judo, training in it exclusively for 14 years. He and his younger brother Neil went on to win national and world championships in judo, with Neil winning a silver medal at both the 1980 Summer Olympics and the 1984 Summer Olympics. Adams was a member of Britain's 1976 Summer Olympics judo squad, but never competed in the Olympics. He held a black belt in judo and was also an expert in other martial arts. In addition, he competed in rugby, cricket, football, and amateur wrestling; away from athletics, he also studied architecture.

Professional wrestling career

Early career and World of Sport (1978–1982)
Adams first entered professional wrestling in 1978 with no true formal training, instead relying on his judo background. He worked for Joint Promotions and frequently wrestled on ITV's World of Sport show). Adams did have some championship success in England, winning the British Commonwealth tag team title with Marty Jones, and the British Light Heavyweight Championship from Mark "Rollerball" Rocco. Adams also competed alongside many British wrestling legends, including Big Daddy, Dave "Fit" Finlay, Dynamite Kid, and Davey Boy Smith. He also engaged in a feud with Adrian Street while competing in England. Adams also tagged on several occasions with fan favourite "Big Daddy" Shirley Crabtree, and often competed against Tony "Banger" Walsh, who eventually became his closest friend during his early days in wrestling.

He moved to Los Angeles in 1981 to compete at the Olympic Auditorium, operated at the time by famed judo legends Mike and Gene LeBell for a few years. Initially, Adams wrestled barefoot, but after his initial tour of the United States in 1981, he began to use wrestling boots, armpads and kneepads, which he would eventually use for the rest of his career. He became famous for a wide variety of moves, including somersaulting out of arm-bars, using backflips, diving through the ring ropes to his opponent on the floor, using a lethal enzuigiri when his left leg was held, and for a powerful thrust kick, which was originally called a "judo kick", later known by its more common name, "superkick". Adams won the NWA Americas title in 1982, and was a NWA Americas tag team title winner with Tom Prichard and Ringo Rigby. He lived in Santa Monica and wrestled throughout the California coast in cards promoted by the LeBells. He also wrestled for Don Owen's Pacific Northwest promotion, as well as being involved in several tours of Japan, Europe, Mexico and Canada.

World Class Championship Wrestling and other Texas promotions (1983–1987)

1983–1984
By 1983, Adams was contacted by Fritz Von Erich to compete in World Class Championship Wrestling. He joined the Dallas-based promotion on 15 April 1983, wrestling twice that night: defeating Roberto Renesto on the card's opening match and the Mongol by disqualification later in the card. Chris was billed as being the "pen pal" of Kevin Von Erich and was also named by the Adkissons as an "honorary Von Erich". Adams was first introduced in WCCW during one of Bill Mercer's "outside the ring" interviews, when Adams and Mercer met for the first time at a local Dallas restaurant over a round of English tea; in a three-minute interview segment titled "Tea for Two". Adams won his first eleven matches before losing his first WCCW bout to Kamala on 20 June in Fort Worth. His first tag match with the Von Erichs took place on 19 August 1983, with Kerry Von Erich as his partner, and he often teamed with the Von Erichs in six- and eight-man tag matches against the Fabulous Freebirds. Soon thereafter, Adams and Jimmy Garvin began battling each other, with valets Sunshine and Precious getting involved. In a 21 October 1983 match at the Sportatorium, Adams disguised himself as "the Masked Avenger" to earn an NWA American Heavyweight Championship shot, which he eventually won at the Reunion Arena on Thanksgiving; this was the first of five World Class American/World Class World Heavyweight title reigns for Adams. his first title reign ended when the title was held up in the rematch at WCCW Star Wars when Garvin pinned him.
Following a loser-leaves-town match victory over Garvin on 4 July 1984 in Fort Worth, Adams split his time between Dallas and Los Angeles, as his brother Neil was competing in judo at the 1984 Summer Olympics.

In August, Adams hired manager Gary Hart, and eventually turned heel following a 28 September 1984 tag team match at the Dallas Sportatorium. After Adams was pinned by Kevin Von Erich in a 27 October 1984 match, he was offered a deal to fire Hart and all would be forgiven with the Von Erichs. Adams then grabbed a wooden chair and smashed it on Von Erich's head. According to Adams, the chair had accidentally broken in half, which resulted in a concussion and bleeding. Von Erich eventually returned the favour to Adams a month later at the Reunion Arena, and again, the chair broke in half on impact, with part of the wood lodged in Adams' nose, very close to his eye. This resulted in an abrupt end to the angle. Adams later competed in a six-man tag team match alongside Jake Roberts and Gino Hernandez, defeating Kerry Von Erich, Mike Von Erich and Bobby Fulton (subbing for the injured Kevin Von Erich). During that match, the fans chanted "Chris is a traitor" while others held "Benedict Adams" signs. However, he often competed as a face in Bill Watts' Mid South (later UWF) promotion.

1985–1986
In early 1985, Adams (kayfabe) fired Hart and began feuding with virtually every WCCW wrestler, face or heel. He tag teamed with Gino Hernandez to form the second version of the Dynamic Duo. In addition, Adams wrestled NWA World Champion Ric Flair several times, nearly winning the championship on two occasions. In one match, interference by the One Man Gang cost Adams, who had Flair pinned for at least 10 seconds while the referee was distracted. Another angle Adams was involved in was a battle of superkicks with the Great Kabuki, who was brought in by Sunshine in her feud against Adams. While paired with Hernandez, Adams developed a gimmick that was later used by Brutus Beefcake-cutting his opponents' hair after a match. This led to an October 1985 showdown at the Cotton Bowl in Dallas, where Adams and Hernandez faced Kevin and Kerry Von Erich in a lumberjack hair vs. hair match, which was won by the Von Erichs and resulted in Adams and Hernandez being shaved bald, forcing the pair to temporarily wrestle under masks as their hair grew back. Adams and Hernandez split and engaged in a lengthy feud. During this time, Adams began competing in Gary Hart's Texas All-Star Wrestling promotion in San Antonio, and eventually began his face turn.

On Christmas night in 1985, Adams and Hernandez reunited to face The Cosmic Cowboys (actually Kevin and Kerry Von Erich). During the match, Hernandez, claiming a knee injury, refused to be tagged in by Adams, who took a brutal beating at the hands of the Von Erichs. Adams deliberately threw Kevin over the rope to end the match, then slapped Hernandez for not tagging him and left the ring. This led to a 27 January 1986 encounter at the Convention Center in Fort Worth, where Adams and Hernandez faced each other with the stipulation that the loser would lose his hair again, this time by having Freebird Hair Cream rubbed into the scalp. Adams twice refused to pin Hernandez, and while arguing with referee Rick Hazzard, Hernandez threw some of the hair cream (actually a dark liquid substance) into Adams' eyes, causing Adams to win by disqualification. The blinding incident was used to write off Adams' time off to visit relatives in England as well as go on a tour to Japan and Israel before returning to Texas to continue his feud with Hernandez. However, Hernandez was found dead on 4 February 1986 from a cocaine overdose. Four days after Adams returned to England, he was questioned by Scotland Yard about Hernandez's death (which was originally ruled a homicide), but eventually Adams was not considered a suspect, and Hernandez's death was ruled an overdose. On 30 June, while returning from a wrestling event in Puerto Rico, Adams headbutted an airline pilot and punched a male flight attendant, which resulted in a 90-day jail sentence and a $500 fine. During the flight, an intoxicated Adams became belligerent when liquor sales were stopped during the flight by an onboard FAA Inspector who happened to be onboard, and Adams had to be restrained by Kevin Von Erich.

In March 1986, Adams toured Japan and competed in several events for New Japan Pro Wrestling. These matches never aired on World Class television as he was still selling his blinding angle. In April, Adams returned to Texas All-Star Wrestling and WCCW, had several matches with Matt Borne, Blackjack Mulligan, Kabuki and Buzz Sawyer, and worked an angle with Rick Rude, during which he won the World Class heavyweight title on 4 July. Adams held the WCCW title until leaving the promotion in September due to legal troubles, thus forfeiting the title; WCCW explained that Black Bart won the title in a match in Los Angeles that never actually took place. Bart would eventually lose the title to Kevin Von Erich a month later at the Cotton Bowl. Adams left World Class in mid-September 1986 to join Bill Watts' Universal Wrestling Federation, which later absorbed into the NWA. Adams returned to World Class in October 1987.

Various promotions (1987–1997)
In late 1986, Adams defected to the Universal Wrestling Federation, where he became a tag team champion with Terry Taylor in February 1987. Two months later, Taylor and Adams began a violent feud which eventually was carried over to WCCW in 1988. Adams and former partner King Parsons also engaged in a similar feud, which would continue on and off for the next decade. Adams also wrestled in Missouri, competing in Mike George's World Wrestling Alliance promotion (formerly Central States Wrestling) and had brief stints in Georgia in Southern Championship Wrestling (where he won that federation's heavyweight title in 1988) and Florida before going into promoting his own matches late in the year under the brand L&A Promotions, with Tom Lance as his business partner. Adams also was on his way to defeating Ric Flair for the N.W.A. title but during pinfall attempts Kevin Von Erich and One Man Gang got Adams disqualified.

In late 1988, Adams began operating his professional wrestling school at the Dallas Sportatorium, upon returning to World Class. In 1989, Steve Austin was one of Adams' students, and within five months, he wrestled his first pro match at the Sportatorium. The duo feuded against each other throughout the United States Wrestling Association. Adams was arrested in February in Lufkin, Texas, however, after his wife, Toni, was found severely beaten, allegedly by Adams during a drunken rage. He was sentenced to a year's probation. In late 1990, following the demise of WCCW, Adams competed in the Pat O'Connor Memorial Tag Team Tournament at Starrcade alongside Norman Smiley against Konnan and Rey Misterio, in which Konnan pinned Smiley. Adams then faced more legal woes in 1991, when he was put on probation for a pair of DUI arrests. Adams also wrestled in various other independent promotions, including the Global Wrestling Federation (GWF), in which he won that federation's Heavyweight Championship twice in 1994, and briefly with Jim Crockett's 1995 version of the National Wrestling Alliance (NWA). Adams also promoted a tour to Nigeria in 1993 (co-sponsored with Pepsi), which was a modest success. The tour featured several former WWF and NWA stars, including The Iron Sheik.  He also competed on and off in Mexico prior to joining the GWF.

During his stint in the GWF, Adams was involved in a 1993 match against Rod Price, in which Adams accidentally tore the hair weave off Price's head, which resulted in stitches. He also resumed his legendary feud with Iceman King Parsons, in which his wife Toni was Parsons' manager. During one interview segment, Toni and Iceman were making their plans to vacation in Hawaii, where Adams and Toni married in 1985. Adams also formed a tag team with Kerry Von Erich, until Von Erich's suicide on 18 February 1993. On the side, Adams also travelled to Memphis, Tennessee and competed in the United States Wrestling Association for a few months, where he was involved in an angle involving Brian Christopher, while Toni was billed as "Nanny Simpson." Adams also faced Eddie Gilbert several times for the heavyweight title. After his stint in the Global Wrestling Federation, Adams joined the Jim Crockett-promoted NWA Dallas and wrestled in several matches against Greg Valentine, Black Bart, Michael Hayes and Tully Blanchard. After his stint in the NWA, Adams competed in the American Wrestling Federation, a Chicago-based organisation, that promoted under European wrestling rules. While there he feuded with Jonnie Stewart. He was also a promoter and wrestler of a few Dallas-based organisations, including Big D Pro Wrestling and the Freestyle Wrestling Federation.

World Championship Wrestling (1997–1999)
In 1997, Adams began competing in World Championship Wrestling as a midcard performer. He was intended to become part of The Blue Bloods, a stable consisting of his fellow Englishmen Lord Steven Regal and Squire David Taylor, but the idea was short lived due to legitimate personal issues that Regal and Adams had with each other. Adams then feuded with Glacier in a battle of superkicks, and then locked horns with Chip Minton. Adams wrestled Randy Savage in the first match of the first WCW Thunder show in January 1998; he pinned Savage, but J. J. Dillon reversed the decision and awarded Savage the victory via disqualification due to Lex Luger's interference. Aside from that, he was primarily used as a jobber and in late 1999, Adams was granted his release from WCW, unsatisfied with his role in the organisation. He returned to Texas as a promoter and part-time wrestler, appearing for a time in the NWA Southwest organisation.

Personal life
Adams was involved in a relationship with  English model Jeanie Clarke, who worked at ringside and managed his career from the late 1970s to the early 1980s. Together, they had a daughter, Jade. Adams later married Toni Collins on 20 December 1984 in Hawaii. Together they had a son, Christopher Jr. The pair divorced on 15 August 1994. Toni died on 24 June 2010 at the age of 45. Adams also fathered a daughter, Julia (born 1994), by Brandi Freeman. She wrestled as "Miss Brandi" in a handful of wrestling cards that Adams promoted before going to WCW. The couple split in late 1999. Freeman died in 2003 from a drug overdose, leaving Julia orphaned. His second marriage occurred only six weeks prior to his death. He wed Karen J. Burge on 25 August 2001 in Dallas.

Death
In April 2000, Adams and his girlfriend of four months, Linda Kaphengst, were both found unconscious inside a friend's apartment, the victims of an overdose of the drug GHB and alcohol. Adams recovered, but Kaphengst died at a local hospital 10 hours later. Over a year later, Adams was indicted on a manslaughter charge, but on 7 October 2001, while awaiting trial, he was fatally shot in the chest during a drunken brawl with a friend, Brent "Booray" Parnell, in Waxahachie, Texas, at his home. The gun owner claimed self-defense and was acquitted of all charges. Prior to his death, Adams, who was considered semi-retired, planned to move permanently to Florida and compete in a wrestling organization featuring several former WCW and WWE stars, including Hulk Hogan. Adams was also planning to produce, along with Gary Hart, Bill Mercer, Mickey Grant and others, a pro wrestling documentary, which was to have included footage of wrestling matches dating back to the 1930s.

Legacy
A documentary about Adams, The Gentleman's Choice, was released on 16 December 2008 by former WCCW promoter Mickey Grant and featured interviews from many of Adams' friends and family, including his brother Neil, Bill Mercer, referee David Manning, Kevin Von Erich, Jeanie Clarke (billed as Jeanie Adams in the documentary), his widow Karen, and Gary Hart. Skandor Akbar and Marc Lowrance were approached to help do interviews and stories on Adams during the documentary, but both declined to participate. 

In 2011, Adams' daughter Jade launched a memorial website in his honour, alongside his son Chris Jr. and youngest daughter Julia. In 2015, the wrestling career of Adams was recognized with a Lifetime Achievement Award at the British Wrestlers Reunion in Kent. The award was presented to Adams' former valet and longtime friend Jeanie Clarke.

Championships and accomplishments
Global Wrestling Federation
GWF North American Heavyweight Championship (2 times)
National Class Wrestling
NCW Heavyweight Championship (1 time)
NWA Hollywood Wrestling
NWA Americas Heavyweight Championship (2 times)
NWA Americas Tag Team Championship (2 times) – with Tom Prichard (1) and Ringo Rigsby
NWA "Beat the Champ" Television Championship (1 time)
Pro Wrestling Illustrated
PWI Most Inspirational Wrestler of the Year (1986)
PWI ranked him #160 of the 500 best singles wrestlers of the "PWI Years" in 2003
PWI ranked him #65 of the 100 best tag teams of the "PWI Years" with Gino Hernandez in 2003
Southern Championship Wrestling
SCW Heavyweight Championship (1 time)
Universal Wrestling Association
WWF Light Heavyweight Championship (1 time)1
Universal Wrestling Federation
UWF World Tag Team Championship (1 time) – with Terry Taylor
World Class Championship Wrestling / World Class Wrestling Association
NWA American Heavyweight Championship (4 times)
NWA American Tag Team Championship (2 times) – with Gino Hernandez
NWA Texas Brass Knuckles Championship (1 time)
NWA Texas Heavyweight Championship (1 time)
NWA World Six-Man Tag Team Championship (Texas version) (2 times) – with Gino Hernandez and Jake Roberts (1), and Steve Simpson and Kevin Von Erich (1)
WCCW Television Championship (3 times)
WCWA Television Championship (1 time)
WCWA World Heavyweight Championship (1 time)

1While he did win the championship, the win and reign are no longer recognised by World Wrestling Entertainment. All reigns with the championship prior to December 1997 are not officially recognised.

See also
 List of premature professional wrestling deaths

References

Other sources

External links
Official website
Chris Adams at Online World of Wrestling
"Gentleman's Choice"

1955 births
2001 deaths
Deaths by firearm in Texas
English male judoka
English male professional wrestlers
Judoka trainers
Sportspeople from Rugby, Warwickshire
Professional wrestling promoters
Professional wrestling trainers
20th-century professional wrestlers
GWF North American Heavyweight Champions
NWA "Beat the Champ" Television Champions
WCWA Brass Knuckles Champions
NWA Americas Tag Team Champions
NWA Americas Heavyweight Champions